First-seeded Roy Emerson defeated Arthur Ashe 6–4, 6–8, 6–2, 6–3 in the final to win the men's singles tennis title at the 1966 Australian Championships.

Seeds
The seeded players are listed below. Roy Emerson is the champion; others show the round in which they were eliminated.

  Roy Emerson (champion)
  Arthur Ashe (finalist)
  Fred Stolle (semifinals)
  Clark Graebner (quarterfinals)
  John Newcombe (semifinals)
 n/a
  Tony Roche (quarterfinals)
  Marty Riessen (third round)
  Bill Bowrey (quarterfinals)
  Tom Okker (third round)
  Owen Davidson (third round)
  Ken Fletcher (first round)
  John Cottrill (third round)
  Herb Fitzgibbon (third round)
  Ray Ruffels (third round)
  Roger Taylor (third round)

Draw

Key
 Q = Qualifier
 WC = Wild card
 LL = Lucky loser
 r = Retired

Final eight

Earlier rounds

Section 1

Section 2

Section 3

Section 4

External links
 1966 Australian Championships on ITFtennis.com, the source for this draw

1966 in Australian tennis
1966
Men's Singles